Government First Grade College is a college in the Kolar Gold Fields. This college is offering courses in B.A., BCom, BBA, and B.Sc.

The college was started in the year 2007. It is one among a very few newly started government degree colleges in Kolar district during that period to be the front runner in academic and non-academic activities. In the last four years, the institute has made significant progress in terms of student enrollment, examination results and co-curricular activities.

The college is located in the heart of the city of Kolar Gold Fields and is affiliated to Bangalore University. It offers undergraduate programmes in Arts, Commerce, Management and Science. It has total students strength comprising both boys and girls around 750, led by an eminent principal, 20 highly qualified, experienced and dedicated permanent and 25 guest faculties.

When the college was started in the year 2007, there was not even a single government degree college in and around the city of Kolar Gold Fields. Students had to either go far away or to shell out a huge amount of money to the private institutions for higher education. Starting of this Government First Grade College was timely and a boon to the poor and needy students of K.G.F. and its surrounding villages. Yes good

References

Colleges affiliated to Bangalore University
Educational institutions established in 2007
2007 establishments in Karnataka
Universities and colleges in Kolar district
Kolar Gold Fields